Ian Book (born March 30, 1998) is an American football quarterback for the Philadelphia Eagles of the National Football League (NFL). He played college football at Notre Dame and was drafted by the New Orleans Saints in the fourth round of the 2021 NFL Draft.

High school career
Book was born on March 30, 1998, in El Dorado Hills, California, and played high school football at Oak Ridge High School. He originally committed to Washington State but flipped his commitment to Notre Dame.

College career

2016 season
Book took a redshirt his freshman year in order to preserve a year of eligibility. He sat behind starters Malik Zaire and DeShone Kizer in addition to primary backup Brandon Wimbush.

2017 season 
Book sat behind Wimbush throughout the 2017 season, but he started for an injured Wimbush against North Carolina, propelling the Irish to a 33–10 victory over the Tar Heels in his first collegiate start on October 7, 2017. During the 2018 Citrus Bowl, Book came off the bench and led the Irish to a 21–17 victory over LSU.

2018 season 
After a pair of slim home victories over unranked opponents Ball State and Vanderbilt in 2018, Book was chosen as the starter over Wimbush for a road game against Wake Forest. The result was a 56–27 Notre Dame victory, with Book throwing for 325 yards and two touchdowns, and running for three more. Against #7 Stanford the next week, Book threw for 278 yards and four touchdowns in a 38–17 rout of the Cardinal. The Irish continued to move up the rankings under Book, and in week 10, Book threw for two touchdown passes and ran 23 yards for a score in the closing minutes to lead No. 3 Notre Dame to a close 31–21 victory over Northwestern. Book helped the Irish to finish the regular season 12–0 and earn its first College Football Playoff berth, although the Irish were defeated by the eventual national champion Clemson in the 2018 Cotton Bowl Classic, 30–3.

2019 season 
On September 14, 2019, Book threw for 360 yards and five touchdowns. He also had one rushing touchdown in a 66–14 win over New Mexico. He contributed to the most points scored in a home opener at Notre Dame since 1932.

On October 5, 2019, Book threw five touchdowns in the first half against Bowling Green State University, becoming the first player in Notre Dame history to have five scores in one half. On November 9, 2019, Book threw four touchdown passes in a win against Duke. On November 16, 2019, Book threw for 284 yards and five touchdowns against Navy Midshipmen football, making him the first Notre Dame quarterback in history to have five touchdown passes in three games for one season.

2020 season 
On December 29, 2019, Book announced via Instagram that he would be returning to Notre Dame for a fifth season as a redshirt senior. On December 5, 2020, Book passed Tom Clements, Ron Powlus, and Brady Quinn for most wins as a quarterback in Notre Dame football history with 30 total wins as a starter. His 72 touchdown passes are second all-time in program history.  He finished 9th in the Heisman Trophy voting. He helped lead Notre Dame to an appearance in the College Football Playoff, where they eventually lost to Alabama in the Semifinal Round in the Rose Bowl.

College statistics

Professional career

New Orleans Saints
Book was drafted by the New Orleans Saints in the fourth round with the 133rd overall pick in the 2021 NFL Draft. He signed his four-year rookie contract with New Orleans on June 8, 2021. 

On December 23, 2021, he was named that week's starting quarterback after Taysom Hill and Trevor Siemian were placed on the reserve/COVID list. This made him the fourth quarterback the Saints named as a starter during an injury-riddled season. In the game, his NFL debut and first career start, Book was 12-20 for 135 yards and two interceptions. The Saints would lose the game to the Miami Dolphins, 20-3. 

On August 30, 2022, Book was waived by the Saints.

Philadelphia Eagles
On August 31, 2022, Book was claimed off waivers by the Philadelphia Eagles.

NFL career statistics

References

External links
New Orleans Saints bio
Notre Dame Fighting Irish bio

1998 births
Living people
People from El Dorado Hills, California
Sportspeople from Greater Sacramento
Players of American football from California
American football quarterbacks
Notre Dame Fighting Irish football players
New Orleans Saints players
Philadelphia Eagles players